Travell is a given name and a surname.

Notable people with the given name include:
Travell Dixon (born 1991), American football player
Travell Mazion (1995–2020), American boxer 

Notable people with the surname include:
Janet G. Travell (1901–1997), American physician and medical researcher